Lloydminster was a provincial electoral district in Alberta, Canada, mandated to return a single member to the Legislative Assembly of Alberta using the first past the post method of voting from 1971 to 1993.

History
The Lloydminster electoral district was created prior to the 1971 general election to represent Lloydminster and the surrounding area. Prior to the 1971 election, Lloydminster was part of the Alexandria electoral district.

Prior to the 1993 general election, Lloydminster was merged with parts of the former Vermilion-Viking electoral district (which had also been created for the 1971 election) to form the current district of Vermilion-Lloydminster.  Since 1971, both Lloydminster and Vermilion-Lloydminster have elected Progressive Conservative MLAs.

Members of the Legislative Assembly (MLAs)

Election results

1971 general election

1975 general election

1979 general election

1982 general election

1986 general election

1989 general election

See also
List of Alberta provincial electoral districts
Lloydminster, a city on the border of Alberta and Saskatchewan

References

Further reading

External links
Elections Alberta
The Legislative Assembly of Alberta

Former provincial electoral districts of Alberta
Lloydminster